Cerapoda ("ceratopsians"  and "ornithopods") is a clade of the dinosaur order Ornithischia, that includes pachycephalosaurs, ceratopsians and ornithopods

Classification
Cerapoda is divided into two groups: Ornithopoda ("bird-foot") and Marginocephalia ("fringed heads"). The latter group includes the Pachycephalosauria ("thick-headed lizards") and Ceratopsia ("horned faces"). The following taxonomy follows Richard J. Butler, Paul Upchurch and David B. Norman, 2008 (and Butler et al., 2011) unless otherwise noted.

Cerapoda was first named by Sereno in 1986 and defined by him as "Parasaurolophus walkeri Parks, 1922, Triceratops horridus Marsh, 1889, their most recent common ancestor and all descendants". In 2021, Cerapoda was given a formal definition under the PhyloCode: "The smallest clade containing Iguanodon bernissartensis Boulenger in Beneden, 1881, Pachycephalosaurus wyomingensis (Gilmore, 1931), and Triceratops horridus Marsh, 1889."

The cladogram below follows a 2011 analysis by paleontologists Richard J. Butler, Jin Liyong, Chen Jun and Pascal Godefroit.

References

Ornithischians
Bajocian first appearances
Maastrichtian extinctions
Taxa named by Paul Sereno